Inger Stolt-Nielsen (born 5 March 1943) is a Norwegian schoolteacher and politician.

She was born in Haugesund to Andreas Stolt-Nielsen and Constance Lothe. She was elected representative to the Storting for the period 1997–2001 for the Conservative Party (transfer to the Coastal Party at the end of the term).

References

1943 births
Living people
People from Haugesund
Conservative Party (Norway) politicians
Coastal Party politicians
Members of the Storting